Anomoeotes nox is a species of moth of the Anomoeotidae family. It is known from the Republic of the Congo.

References

Endemic fauna of the Republic of the Congo
Anomoeotidae
Fauna of the Republic of the Congo
Moths of Africa
Moths described in 1907